Polybranchia orientalis is a species of sacoglossan sea slug, a shell-less marine opisthobranch gastropod mollusk in the family Caliphyllidae.

Distribution 
This species occurs in the Indian Ocean and the Pacific Ocean.

References

 Jensen K.R. (2007) Biogeography of the Sacoglossa (Mollusca, Opisthobranchia). Bonner Zoologische Beiträge 55:255–281

External links 
 SeaSlug Forum info

Caliphyllidae
Gastropods described in 1858